Winkle Island may refer to:
 Winkle Island (Hastings), a traffic island in the town of Hastings, England
 Winkle Islands, in Northern Ireland
 Winkle Island (Antarctica)
 Winkle Island, near Warir, West Papua, Indonesia